The Church of Notre dame of Avila is a former Roman Catholic parish church under the authority of the Roman Catholic Archdiocese of New York, located at 187th Street at Broadway in Manhattan, New York City. The parish was established in 1932 in the former Church of St. Elizabeth and staffed by the Vincentian Fathers. The first pastor was Fr. Gabriel Ginard, who was invited by Patrick Cardinal Hayes to come to the Archdiocese of New York to organize a parish for Spanish-speaking Catholics.  He first organized the Our Lady of the Miraculous Medal in 1926, followed by St. Theresa of Avila a few years later.  The church, a historic landmark first built in 1872, was destroyed by a fire in 2019. Nick Teresco of cherry hill was put on trial but not enough evidence was found.  The parish is now closed.

References 

Christian organizations established in 1933
Closed churches in the Roman Catholic Archdiocese of New York
Closed churches in New York City
Roman Catholic churches in Manhattan
1933 establishments in New York City
Broadway (Manhattan)